is a private university located in the city of Nisshin, Aichi Prefecture in the “Chubu” (central) area of Japan. Founded in 1988, it is known domestically by the name “Nagoya Gaidai” and its English abbreviation as NUFS.

Overview

About NUFS 
Nagoya University of Foreign Studies (NUFS) is the only university specializing in international studies and foreign languages education in the Chubu（Central）Region of Japan. Its programs aim to develop students with genuine international and global perspectives through a distinctive education system; language, liberal arts and specialized education. It offers small-group teaching, which takes place in groups of four students and a native teacher for all major language courses, so that students can acquire genuine language skills. NUFS, which has more than 300 foreign teachers and students from all over the world, has an international campus that is integrated in the following five domains: study abroad programs; active learning; native speakers; career support; and an international campus. It belongs to the Association of 7 GAIDAI (Foreign Studies Universities) in Japan. It ranks 74th In the THE (Times Higher Education) Japan University Rankings 2019 and ranks 9th in their pillar of internationalization among about 750 universities.

History 
1988 —  Founded Nagoya University of Foreign Studies (Department of British and American Studies, Department of French Studies and Department of Chinese Studies.

1994 — Opened School of Global Business and Economics.

1997 —  Opened Graduate School of International Studies.

1999 — Established Doctoral Program (second semester) at Graduate School of International Studies. Reorganized Master's Program into Doctoral Program (first semester). Opened Department of Japanese Studies.

2001 —  Established Japanese Language Institute (afterwards renamed to The International Institute for Japanese Language Education).

2004 —  Opened School of Contemporary International Studies (the Department of English and Contemporary Society and the Department of Global Business).

2008 —  Established the Department of English Language Teaching in the School of Foreign Studies.

2013 —  Established the Department of Liberal Arts and Global Studies in the School of Contemporary International Studies.

2015 — Established the Department of World Liberal Arts.

2017 — Opened School of Global Governance and Collaboration (the Department of Global Governance and Collaboration).

2019 — Opened School of World Liberal Arts (the Department of World Liberal Arts and the Department of International Japanese Studies).

Facilities

Campus 
The NUFS campus is situated in the hill country east of Nagoya City. This area of Nissin City includes the campuses of several other universities as well, so it is considered an academic zone.

Dormitory 
Very close to the university campus is the dormitory for overseas exchange students, who mainly come from the school's partner universities around the world. Aside from the foreign residents, some of the graduate and undergraduate students are selected as Resident Assistants.

 International House
 Global Village
 NUFS-NUAS residence

Schools

Undergraduate Schools 
School of Foreign Studies
Department of British and American Studies
Department of French Studies
Department of Chinese Studies
School of Contemporary International Studies
Department of English and Contemporary Society
Department of Global Business
Department of Liberal Arts and Global Studies
School of Global Governance and Collaboration
Department of Global Governance and Collaboration
School of World Liberal Arts
Department of World Liberal Arts
Department of International Japanese Studies

Graduate School of International Studies 
Master’s Programs
English and English Language Education（English and English Language Education Program）・・・ Master of Arts in English and English Language Education
English and English Language Education（TESOL Program）・・・・ Master of Arts in English and English Language Education
Japanese and Japanese Language Education・・・・ Master of Arts in Japanese and Japanese Language Education
Global Communication・・・・・ Master of Arts in Global Communication  Studies
Doctoral Programs
English Language Studies and English Language Pedagogy・・・・Doctor of Philosophy in English Linguistics and English Pedagogy
Japanese Language Studies and Japanese Language Pedagogy・・・・ Doctor of Philosophy in Japanese Linguistics and Japanese Pedagogy
Global Communication・・・・・ Doctor of Philosophy in Global Communication Studies

Programs for Inbound Studies (The International Institute for Japanese Language Education) 
Nagoya University of Foreign Studies offers three unique programs for exchange students coming from partner institutions.

 Study Exchange Program: Global Japan Program
 Study Abroad at NUFS Undergraduate and Graduate Schools 
 Study Abroad - Language Teaching Practicum Program

Research institute 
 World Liberal Arts Center（WLAC）() 
 Research Institute for New Global Society（RINGS）()
 Dostoevsky Society of Japan（DSJ）()

Publishing house 
 Nagoya University of Foreign Studies Press

Overseas partners 
The university has agreements with 145 partner institutions spread across 27 nations.

U.S.A. 
 Grand Canyon University 
 Monterey Institute of International Studies 
 University of Tennessee at Chattanooga 
 California State University, Los Angeles 
 The University of Cincinnati 
 Western Washington University 
 Clemson University 
 The University of North Carolina Greensboro 
 Carson-Newman University 
 The University of Iowa 
 Georgia Southern University 
 Campbellsville University 
 New Mexico State University 
 Kansas State University 
 University of Texas at San Antonio 
 The University of Evansville 
 Lindsey Wilson College 
 Coastal Carolina University 
 California State University Monterey Bay 
 Hawaii Pacific University 
 The University of North Carolina at Charlotte 
 Brescia University 
 University of California, Riverside 
 University of Pikeville 
 Southern Oregon University 
 Pacific University 
 University of Denver 
 California State University Bakersfield 
 Indiana University of Pennsylvania 
 Western Carolina University 
 University of the Ozarks 
 Dickinson State University 
 Northeastern Illinois University 
 Longwood University 
 Arkansas Tech University 
 Youngstown State University 
 California State University Stanislaus 
 Chatham University 
 California State University San Marcos 
 George Mason University 
 University of Oregon 
 California State Polytechnic University, Pomona

Canada 
 University of Montreal 
 School of Continuing Studies, University of Toronto 
 Algoma University 
 Medicine Hat College 
 Selkirk College 
 University of Lethbridge 
 Yukon College 
 North Island College 
 St. Lawrence College 
 Okanagan College 
 Lakehead University 
 Seneca College 
 Brock University 
 University of the Fraser Valley 
 The Université du Québec à Montréal

Mexico 
 Universidad Autonoma de Guadalajara

U.K. 
 Bath Spa University 
 Middlesex University 
 Oxford Brookes University 
 University of Central Lancashire 
 University of Kent 
 University of Winchester 
 University of Portsmouth 
 Northumbria University 
 University of Chichester 
 University of Worcester 
 Keele University 
 University of the Highlands and Islands 
 Manchester Metropolitan University 
 Bangor University

Australia 
 Griffith University 
 The University of Newcastle 
 Australian Catholic University 
 University of the Sunshine Coast 
 The University of Adelaide 
 University of South Australia 
 University of Tasmania 
 Macquarie University 
 Southern Cross University 
 Western Sydney University 
 Central Queensland University 
 Charles Darwin University

New Zealand 
 The University of Waikato 
 Massey University

Ireland 
 University of Limerick

France 
 University of Marne-La Vallee 
 University of Paris-Sorbonne (Paris IV),Course of French Civilization 
 University of Stendhal-Grenoble 3 
 University of Jean Moulin Lyon 3 
 University of Michel de Montaigne Bordeaux 3 
 Aix-Marseille University 
 University of Caen Lower-Normandy 
 Catholic University of Lyon 
 University of Nice Sophia Antipolis 
 The University of Toulouse 
 Catholic University of the West 
 Paris Diderot University 
 Catholic Institute of Toulouse 
 Charles de Gaulle University - Lille 3 
 University of Franche-Comté

French Polynesia 
 University of French Polynesia

Belgium 
 Superior Institute of Translators and Interpreters 
 The University of Liege 
 Artevelde University College

Italy 
 University of Turin 
 The University of Sassari

Germany 
 University of Marburg 
 Technical University of Ingolstadt 
 Nuertingen-Geislingen University

Netherlands 
 University of Applied Sciences Saxion 
 HU University of Applied Sciences Utrecht

Spain 
 University of Malaga 
 University of Huelva 
 University of Rey Juan Carlos 
 University of Granada

Portugal 
 University Fernando Pessoa

Denmark 
 University College of Northern Denmark

Finland 
 Savonia University of Applied Sciences

Switzerland 
 University of Applied Sciences and Arts Northwestern Switzerland

Russia 
 National Research University Higher School of Economics 
 Saint-Petersburg State University

Poland 
 Jagiellonian University

Czech Republic 
 University of Hradec Králové

Hungary 
 Pázmány Péter Catholic University

China 
 Beijing Foreign Studies University 
 Xi'an Foreign Languages University 
 Dalian University of Foreign Languages 
 Tianjin Foreign Studies University 
 Shanghai International Studies University 
 Dalian University

Taiwan 
 Ming Chuan University 
 National Taiwan University 
 Wenzao Ursuline University of Languages 
 National Central University 
 National Taipei University of Technology

Republic of Korea 
 Busan University of Foreign Studies 
 Jeonju University 
 Woosong University 
 Kookmin University 
 Soongsil University

Vietnam 
 Foreign Trade University 
 University of Languages and International Studies, Vietnam National University, Hanoi

Indonesia 
 BINUS University

References

External links
NUFS English website

Universities and colleges in Aichi Prefecture
Educational institutions established in 1988
Private universities and colleges in Japan
1988 establishments in Japan
Nisshin, Aichi